Neuss Allerheiligen station is a station in the city of Neuss in the German state of North Rhine-Westphalia. It is on the Lower Left Rhine Railway and it is classified by Deutsche Bahn as a category 6 station. The station was opened on 14 December 2003.

The station is served by line S 11 of the Rhine-Ruhr S-Bahn, running between Düsseldorf Airport and Bergisch Gladbach every 20 minutes during the day.

It is also served by bus route 850, 841 and SB53 operated by Stadtwerke Neuss at 20 to 60 minute intervals.

References

Rhine-Ruhr S-Bahn stations
S11 (Rhine-Ruhr S-Bahn)
Neuss
Buildings and structures in Rhein-Kreis Neuss
Railway stations in Germany opened in 2003